Bathytoma luehdorfi is a species of sea snail, a marine gastropod mollusk in the family Borsoniidae.

Description
The size of an adult shell varies between 30 mm and 70 mm. The shell is yellowish brown. The shoulder is concavely flattened, with a crenulated margin next the suture, and a tuberculate periphery. The  surface shows spiral, white, distant sulci, and incremental striae. The white revolving sulci on the brownish surface are very distinctive in this species. The aperture is white.

Distribution
This species occurs in the Pacific Ocean between Japan and the Philippines

References

 Asakura, A. 2001. A revision of the hermit crabs of the genera Catapagurus A. Milne-Edwards and Hemipagurus Smith from the Indo-West Pacific (Crustacea: Decapoda: Anomura: Paguridae). Invertebrate Taxonomy 15: 823-89

External links
 

luehdorfi
Gastropods described in 1872